is a Japanese professional footballer who plays as a midfielder for  club Giravanz Kitakyushu.

Playing career
Taiga Maekawa joined to J2 League club; Cerezo Osaka in 2015. In 2016, he moved to Tokushima Vortis.

Club statistics
.

References

External links

Profile at Giravanz Kitakyushu

1996 births
Living people
Association football people from Osaka Prefecture
Japanese footballers
J2 League players
J3 League players
Cerezo Osaka players
Tokushima Vortis players
Avispa Fukuoka players
Montedio Yamagata players
Giravanz Kitakyushu players
J.League U-22 Selection players
People from Settsu, Osaka
Association football midfielders